Kogula may refer to several places in Estonia:

Kogula, Lääne-Saare Parish, village in Lääne-Saare Parish, Saare County
Kogula, Valjala Parish, village in Valjala Parish, Saare County